#RealityHigh (stylized as #REALITYHIGH) is a 2017 American teen comedy film directed by Fernando Lebrija. It was released on Netflix on September 8, 2017.

Plot

Dani Barnes, the protagonist of the movie, is an excellent high-school student who receives straight As and is focused on getting a scholarship to U.C. Davis. She is highly passionate about dogs, so volunteers at the local dog clinic. Being considered an unfashionable nerd, Dani is not very popular at her school. Her only friend is her best friend Freddie Myers, who develops a secret crush on her, but Dani does not seem to register Freddie’s feelings for her. She only has eyes for Cameron Drake, on whom she has had a crush since childhood. Unlike Dani, Cameron is one of the most popular guys at her school, and unfortunately for her, also Alexa Medina's boyfriend. Alexa, Dani's “bully“ and former childhood best friend, portrays exactly the opposite of her: She is idolized by the entire school and also has numerous followers on various social-media platforms. After breaking up with her boyfriend Cameron, resulting in Dani and Cameron getting closer, Alexa suddenly shows great interest in befriending Dani again. She offers Dani a fresh start and apologizes for treating her badly. Alexa integrates her into her friend group, thus draws her into a completely new Southern California scene, consisting of excessively high-cost shopping and partying. Dani begins to enjoy the popularity she gains, as well as the attention Alexa brings her, which eventually leads to Dani losing herself within this new, superficial lifestyle to which she has adjusted. Her improved social status causes her to lose sight of much more significant things, such as sincere, honest friendship. Alexa, though, cannot be trusted, which Dani finally finds out on her own after experiencing strong betrayal.

Cast

Reception 
The film has garnered mostly negative reviews, with a 40% rating on Rotten Tomatoes and one star from Common Sense Media.

References

External links
 
 
 

2017 films
2017 comedy films
2010s coming-of-age comedy films
2010s high school films
2010s teen comedy films
American coming-of-age comedy films
American high school films
American teen comedy films
Films about social media
Films shot in Los Angeles
English-language Netflix original films
2010s English-language films
2010s American films